Antiochis of Commagene — was a Princess from the Kingdom of Commagene, who lived in the 1st century BC. She was of Greek and Iranian descent.

Family 
Antiochis was the second daughter of King Antiochus I Theos of Commagene and Queen Isias Philostorgos. Unfortunately very little is known on Antiochis. The identity of her husband is unknown and she had a daughter called Aka, also known as Aka I of Commagene.

She appeared to have died of unknown causes sometime between the late 30s or early 20s BC. Antiochis was buried along with her mother and her daughter on a burial site known as the Karakush or Karakuş Tumulus.

Ancestry

References
 https://web.archive.org/web/20160303175103/http://www.guide-martine.com/southeastern3.asp
 Campbell-Scott, Roger. "Nimrud Dagh - A Sacred Mountain in Anatolia", in Vanished Civilizations: The Hidden Secrets of Lost Cities and Forgotten Peoples, pp. 194–197. Reader’s Digest Services P/L, Hong Kong, 1988. .
 

1st-century BC births
1st-century BC deaths
Hellenistic-era people
Year of death unknown
1st-century BC women
Princesses of Commagene
Ancient European women